An annular solar eclipse occurred on June 10, 2002. A solar eclipse occurs when the Moon passes between Earth and the Sun, thereby totally or partly obscuring the image of the Sun for a viewer on Earth. An annular solar eclipse occurs when the Moon's apparent diameter is smaller than the Sun's, blocking most of the Sun's light and causing the Sun to look like an annulus (ring). An annular eclipse appears as a partial eclipse over a region of the Earth thousands of kilometres wide. Annularity was visible in Indonesia, Palau (Kayangel Atoll), Northern Mariana on June 11th (Tuesday), and the western tip of Jalisco, Mexico on June 10th (Monday). This eclipse was during the 2002 FIFA World Cup. The closest apogee occurred on June 4, 2002. It was the first annular solar eclipse visible in the Pacific in 6 months.

Images

Related eclipses

Eclipse season 

This is the second eclipse this season.

First eclipse this season: 26 May 2002 Penumbral Lunar Eclipse

Third eclipse this season: 24 June 2002 Penumbral Lunar Eclipse

Eclipses of 2002 
 A penumbral lunar eclipse on May 26.
 An annular solar eclipse on June 10.
 A penumbral lunar eclipse on June 24.
 A penumbral lunar eclipse on November 20.
 A total solar eclipse on December 4.

Tzolkinex 
 Preceded: Solar eclipse of April 29, 1995

 Followed: Solar eclipse of July 22, 2009

Half-Saros 
 Preceded: Lunar eclipse of June 4, 1993

 Followed: Lunar eclipse of June 15, 2011

Tritos 
 Preceded: Solar eclipse of July 11, 1991

 Followed: Solar eclipse of May 10, 2013

Solar Saros 137 
 Preceded: Solar eclipse of May 30, 1984

 Followed: Solar eclipse of June 21, 2020

Inex 
 Preceded: Solar eclipse of June 30, 1973

 Followed: Solar eclipse of May 21, 2031

Solar eclipses 2000–2003

Saros 137 

It is a part of Saros cycle 137, repeating every 18 years, 11 days, containing 70 events. The series started with partial solar eclipse on May 25, 1389. It contains total eclipses from August 20, 1533 through December 6, 1695, first set of hybrid eclipses from December 17, 1713 through February 11, 1804, first set of annular eclipses from February 21, 1822 through March 25, 1876, second set of hybrid eclipses from April 6, 1894 through April 28, 1930, and second set of annular eclipses from May 9, 1948 through April 13, 2507. The series ends at member 70 as a partial eclipse on June 28, 2633. The longest duration of totality was 2 minutes, 55 seconds on September 10, 1569. Solar Saros 137 has 55 umbral eclipses from August 20, 1533 through April 13, 2507 (973.62 years). That's almost 1 millennium!

Tritos series

Metonic series

References

External links

Photos:
 A Partial Eclipse Over the Golden Gate Bridge, APOD June 12, 2002
 Photos and videos of annular solar eclipse (Japanese)
 Spaceweather.com: June 10, 2002 solar eclipse

2002 6 10
2002 in science
2002 06 10
June 2002 events